Pushpagiri (Kumara Parvatha), at  ft, is the highest peak  in Pushpagiri Wildlife Sanctuary in the Western Ghats of Karnataka. It is located in the Somwarpet Taluk,  from Somwarpet in the northern part of Kodagu district on the border between Dakshina Kannada and Kodagu district and hassan districts. It is 4th highest peak of Karnataka.

Pushpagiri Mountains

The Pushpagiri or Subramanya Hills (also referred as Kumaraparvatha) is the second-highest peak of Kodagu, and fourth highest peak in Karnataka

The Eastern entrance can be reached from Beedehalli via Heggademane temple and the Western entrance from Kukke Subramanya via Giri gadde. However, the entrance through Beedehalli is less strenuous.

The western entrance from Kukke Subramanya is located 165 m above sea level, whereas, the eastern entrance is at 900 m above MSL.

The nearest airport is in Mangalore at a distance of .Trekkers have to obtain permission from the Forest department which is located near Batra Mane, which is also a spot for overnight camping. This place is at a distance of 6 km from Kukke Subramanya.

Mythology 
It is believed that Lord Subramanya's footmark is presented in the hilltop temple. You can see the stone mark still. Top of the hill there are two temples, one is for Lord Shiva and other one for Lord Subramanya. It is believed that if any person has Sharpadosha it can be eliminated by visiting this temple.

River source
This mountain, along with the surrounding hills and the evergreen Pushpagiri wildlife sanctuary, give rise to river Kumaradhara. It is the principal tributary of river Netravathi, that feeds the coastal city of Mangalore.

Climatic conditions
The climate is generally cool and wet. The climate is that of a highland, with no extreme variations. It receives heavy rainfall between June to September. From October to December the area is covered in mist almost all the time.
 Rainfall: Pushpagiri receive about  rainfall every year. As a result, trekking is strictly prohibited from June to September.
 Temperature: November to January are generally the coldest months, with the daytime maximum temperatures that ranges of an average of around 7° to 14 °C. April and May are normally the warmest months here, with temperatures of an average 20 °C.
 Visibility: This place often enjoys good visibility, although hill fog sometimes restricts the visibility.

Trekking at Pushpagiri

See also 
 Kukke Subramanya
 Madikeri
 Mandalapatti
 Mangalore
 Sakleshpur
 Mullayana Giri
 Baba Budan giri
 Brahmagiri
 Kodachadri

Gallery

References

External links 

 World Heritage Western Ghats (sub cluster nomination)
 

Mountains of Karnataka
Geography of Kodagu district
Tourist attractions in Kodagu district
Mountains of the Western Ghats